Document 01 - Trance/Tribal is a various artists compilation album released in 1994 by Dorobo. The album was reissued on April 23, 1996, by Full Contact Records.

Reception

Aiding & Abetting called Document 01 - Trance/Tribal "worth the effort" and "a good set of musicians who try to expand the realm of the subconscious, without offending the intelligence of the conscious. AllMusic awarded The Best of Mind/Body three out of five stars and said "of special interest is the album's finale, "The Heartbeat Fades," a rare solo piece from Paul Schütze of Can fame." Sonic Boom said "shows that classical trained musicians with the proper equipment can compose extraordinarily complex arrays of electronic music that would be at home not only on a dance floor but also as easy listening music for experimental enthusiasts."

Track listing

Personnel
Adapted from the Document 01 - Trance/Tribal liner notes.

 Richard Grant (I+T=R) – design

Release history

References

External links 
 

1994 compilation albums
Full Contact Records compilation albums
Fifth Colvmn Records compilation albums